Fillmore East – June 1971 is a live album by The Mothers, released in 1971. It is the twelfth album in Frank Zappa's discography, and was produced by Zappa and mixed by Toby Foster.

History

Fillmore East – June 1971 is a live concept-like album. It portrays a peek-behind-the-curtain of the life of a rock band on the road as narrated by Frank Zappa, and contains many thematic elements that, because of time and budget constraints, couldn't be included in the similar movie 200 Motels. The most famous part of the album is "The Mud Shark", a telling of a story told to Mother Don Preston by some members of Vanilla Fudge about a hotel, Seattle's Edgewater Inn, where guests could fish from their rooms. In the tale, a mud shark is caught by one of the members of Vanilla Fudge or its crew and, when combined with a groupie and a movie camera, depravity ensues. Although not stated in "The Mud Shark," this 1969 incident, now referred to as "the Shark episode," also involved Led Zeppelin's drummer John Bonham and road manager Richard Cole, with Vanilla Fudge's singer/keyboardist Mark Stein operating the movie camera.

The band then portray stereotypically egotistical members of a rock band "negotiating" for sex with a groupie and her girlfriends. The girls are insulted that the band thinks they are groupies and that they would sleep with the band just because they are musicians. They have standards; they will only have sex with a guy in a group with a "big, hit single in the charts – with a bullet!" and a "dick that’s a monster." In "Bwana Dik", singer Howard Kaylan assures the girls that he is endowed beyond their "wildest Clearasil-spattered fantasies." And, not to be put off by the standards of these groupies, the band sings the girls the Turtles (of which Kaylan, Volman, and Pons had been members) hit "Happy Together", to give them their "bullet".  The album ends with an encore excerpt including both Zappa's familiar "Peaches en Regalia" and what was possibly his most successful early-rock and roll pastiche, "Tears Began to Fall" (also issued as a single).

When this album was first reissued on compact disc by Rykodisc, "Willie the Pimp, Pt. 2" was omitted from the track line-up.  It was finally released on CD on the 2012 reissue of the album. Also, in the CD edition, the last minute of "Latex Solar Beef" was placed at the beginning of "Willie the Pimp Part One", making it longer. It is unclear if this was intentional or not.

John & Yoko and the Mothers
As an encore on one of the two nights of this Fillmore East appearance John Lennon and Yoko Ono emerged from the wings to play a half hour set with the band.  This part of the show was released under Lennon's name on a disc called Live Jam, which was included as a bonus disc with Lennon's album Some Time in New York City. It can also be heard on Zappa's 1992 release Playground Psychotics. It also appears in its complete unedited version, along with the "original" version of "Billy the Mountain", on the expanded triple-LP reissue of Fillmore East and the anniversary set The Mothers 1971, released simultaneously on March 18, 2022.

Lennon used a copy of the cover of the Zappa album (adding his own red-inked credits to the album's black-ink handwritten ones) to provide liner notes for Live Jam.

Track listing

On early CD editions, "Willie the Pimp Part Two" was removed. The track was restored on the 2012 CD reissue.

Bonus tracks (2022) 
The following tracks appear on this album's anniversary expanded edition, released on March 18, 2022.

Personnel
Frank Zappa – guitar, dialogue, vocals
Ian Underwood – woodwinds, keyboards, vocals
Aynsley Dunbar – drums
Howard Kaylan – lead vocals, dialogue
Mark Volman – lead vocals, dialogue
Jim Pons – bass, vocals, dialogue
Bob Harris – keyboards, vocals

Guest
Don Preston – Mini-Moog

Production
Producer: Frank Zappa
Engineer: Barry Keene
Mixing: Toby Foster
Mastering: Toby Foster
Digital remastering: Bob Stone
Cover design: Cal Schenkel
Artwork: Cal Schenkel
Repackaging: Ferenc Dobronyi

Charts

References

External links
Lyrics and information
Release details

1971 live albums
Albums produced by Frank Zappa
Bizarre Records live albums
Frank Zappa live albums
Live at the Fillmore East albums
Reprise Records live albums